Charles Edward Gainor (November 22, 1916 – September 10, 1996) was an American football defensive end who played for the Chicago Cardinals of the National Football League (NFL) for one season in 1939.  He also played for the St. Louis Gunners of the American Football League and the Wilmington Clippers of the American Association.  He played college football for North Dakota and he was drafted by the Philadelphia Eagles in the eighteenth round of the 1939 NFL Draft.  Gainor was inducted into the University of North Dakota Athletics Hall of Fame in 1978.

References

1916 births
1996 deaths
American football defensive ends
North Dakota Fighting Hawks football players
Chicago Cardinals players
St. Louis Gunners players
Players of American football from North Dakota
People from Sargent County, North Dakota
Wilmington Clippers players